The United Kingdom Archaeological Sciences Conference is a biennial conference established in 1987 at the University of Glasgow.

From 1987 to 1999 the conference proceedings were published. Major topics discussed at the conference include stable isotope analysis, proteomics, ancient genetics and material analysis. The 2017 conference at UCL was attended by 190 delegates from 20 countries.

Conference locations

References 

Archaeology of the United Kingdom
Archaeological organizations
British biennial events
Recurring events established in 1987
Science lecture series
1987 establishments in the United Kingdom